Sydney Lee may refer to:

 Sydney Lee (engraver) (1866–1949), British wood engraver
 Sydney Lee (snooker player) (1911–1986), English billiards and snooker player
 Sydney Smith Lee (1802–1869), American naval officer

See also
 Sidney Lee (1859–1926), English biographer, writer and critic